CPPS may refer to:

 Chronic pelvic pain syndrome, a pelvic pain condition affecting men
 Comstock Park Public Schools, a school district in Michigan, US
 C.PP.S., the post-nominal initials of the Missionaries of the Precious Blood
 A Club Penguin private server, unofficial instances of the video game Club Penguin
 Castle Peak Power Station, currently the largest coal-fired power station in Hong Kong.
 Canadian Pacific Police Service
 Certified Professional Property Specialist, a certification offered by the National Property Management Association for industries other than real-estate
 Cyber-physical production system, a variant of a cyber-physical system (CPS)

See also
 CPP (disambiguation)